Milwaukee Soldiers Home is one of three soldiers homes which have survived in the United States. It was built for the rehabilitation of Civil War soldiers. The building is recognized as a National Historic Landmark District property. There are a total of 24 other buildings on the grounds which are also part of the Northwestern Branch, National Home for Disabled Volunteer Soldiers Historic District.

History
The building was completed in 1867 and it went by several names, including National Asylum for Disabled Soldiers and National Home for Disabled Soldiers. The building was unoccupied starting in 1989, and had fallen into disrepair and was scheduled to be demolished. A 2011 campaign successfully got the building designated as a National Historic Landmark. In 2019 a company was hired to update the building. The Wisconsin Housing and Economic Development Authority (WHEDA) worked to help finance the restoration.

See also
Northwestern Branch, National Home for Disabled Volunteer Soldiers Historic District
National Register of Historic Places listings in Milwaukee, Wisconsin
National Historic Landmarks in Wisconsin

Further reading
Milwaukee’s Soldiers Home Patricia A. Lynch

References

External links
Historic Designation
Official Website

Historic sites in Wisconsin
Old soldiers' homes in the United States
Veterans' affairs in the United States
Residential buildings on the National Register of Historic Places in Wisconsin
Victorian architecture in Wisconsin
National Register of Historic Places in Milwaukee
1887 establishments in Wisconsin
Historic American Buildings Survey in Wisconsin
1880s architecture in the United States